The Madison Square Garden Towers were the name of proposed twin  residential skyscrapers that were to be constructed north of Madison Square Garden in Midtown Manhattan, New York City. The project featured a complex of seven buildings, including a stadium and a new Penn Station. The cost of the project was  US$14 billion. The architects Norman Foster and David Childs, and the architectural firm Skidmore, Owings and Merrill were designing the project. The owners were Stephen Ross of Related Cos. and Steven Roth of Vornado Realty Trust. The towers would have risen to be two of the tallest structures in the Midtown Manhattan skyline, with one rising higher than the Empire State Building, currently one of New York's tallest buildings at 1,250 feet (381 m) and would also have been higher than the roof, though not the spire, of One World Trade Center. The towers are essentially canceled as Madison Square Garden is going ahead with renovations of the current arena, rather than a relocation that would have made the towers possible.

See also
 List of tallest buildings in New York City

References

Residential skyscrapers in Manhattan
Proposed skyscrapers in the United States
Proposed buildings and structures in New York City
Madison Square Garden
34th Street (Manhattan)